was a Japanese samurai and feudal lord of the late Sengoku and early Edo periods. His father served as one of the Go-Bugyō in the late Azuchi–Momoyama period.

Asano Yoshinaga was born at Odani, in the Asai district of Ōmi Province, in 1576, the eldest son of Asano Nagamasa, the brother of O-Ne, Toyotomi Hideyoshi's wife. He married a daughter of Ikeda Tsuneoki.

His first action was at the Siege of Odawara, in 1590. In 1593, together with his father, he was granted Fuchu, in Kai Province. Though the Asano family was to be sent to Noto Province as a result of their implication in the alleged treason of Toyotomi Hidetsugu, the good offices of Maeda Toshiie kept them in Kai Province.

Yoshinaga achieved distinction together with his father in 1597, during the Siege of Ulsan, when they held the fortress under the command of Katō Kiyomasa. 

Though the Asano family was secure following its service under Tokugawa Ieyasu at the Battle of Sekigahara, it would be moved to Wakayama Domain, in Kii Province.  The family would again be moved, to Hiroshima Domain, in the early 17th century.

Yoshinaga's three-dimensional battle standard, a gold-plated basketlike object, was well known during the Korean campaign. His daughters, Hanahime married Matsudaira Tadamasa of Fukui Domain and Haruhime (Haruhime was his daughter with Ikeda Tsuneoki's daughter) married Tokugawa Yoshinao of Owari Domain.

References

Berry, Mary Elizabeth. Hideyoshi. Cambridge: Harvard University Press, 1982.
Turnbull, Stephen. The Samurai Sourcebook. Sterling: New Edition, 2000.
Turnbull, Stephen. Samurai Invasion. London: Cassell & Co., 2002.

External links
Genealogy of the lords of Wakayama, including the Asano (in Japanese) 
Genealogy of the Asano after their move to Hiroshima (in Japanese) 
Biographies of various Azuchi-Momoyama generals, including Asano Yoshinaga

Samurai
1576 births
1613 deaths
Daimyo
Asano clan
Deified Japanese people
People from Shiga Prefecture